Max Factor is a line of cosmetics from Coty, Inc.

Max Factor may also refer to:
 Max Factor & Company (1909–1973), a former cosmetics company
 Max Factor Sr. (1877–1938), founder of Max Factor cosmetics
 Max Factor Jr. (1904–1996), U.S. businessman, son of Max Factor, president of the cosmetics company
 Max Factor Building, a building in Hollywood, California
 "The Max Factor", an investigative report about Robert Maxwell by Nisha Pillai

See also

 Greatest common factor or maximum factor